Rowell Huesmann is the Amos N. Tversky Collegiate Professor of Communication Studies and Psychology and research professor in the Institute for Social Research of the University of Michigan. He is currently Director of the Aggression Research Program in the Research Center for Group Dynamics of the Institute for Social Research. He is best known for his emphasis on imitation and observational learning as primary psychological mechanisms promoting the development of aggressive and violent behavior and promoting the contagion of violence. His several longitudinal studies conducted with Leonard Eron and Eric Dubow have shown that more aggressive children grow up to be more aggressive adults and that exposure to violence as a child (including exposure to neighborhood, war, or media violence) is a risk factor for later violent behavior.   Prior to coming to Michigan Huesmann was on the faculty of the University of Illinois at Chicago (1973-1992) and Yale University (1968-1973).  Huesmann received his Ph.D. from Carnegie Mellon University in 1969 and his B.S. from the University of Michigan in 1964.

External links
 Aggression Research Program website

Year of birth missing (living people)
Living people
Carnegie Mellon University alumni
University of Michigan alumni
21st-century American psychologists
University of Illinois Chicago faculty
Yale University faculty
University of Michigan faculty